Highway 927 is a provincial highway in the northeast region of the Canadian province of Saskatchewan. It runs from Highway 912 to East Trout-Nipekamew Lakes Recreation Site. Highway 927 is about 24 km (15 mi) long. The Highway makes up part of the eastern border of, and provides access to, Clarence-Steepbank Lakes Provincial Park.

See also 
Roads in Saskatchewan
Transportation in Saskatchewan

References 

927